The South Africa A cricket team toured India from August till September 2019 to play 2 First-class matches and 5 List-A matches.

India A won the unofficial One-Day series 4–1. They also won the unofficial Test series 1–0.

Squads

List-A series

1st Unofficial ODI

2nd Unofficial ODI

3rd Unofficial ODI

4th Unofficial ODI

5th Unofficial ODI

First-Class series

1st Unofficial Test

2nd Unofficial Test

External links
 Series home at ESPN Cricinfo

References

A team cricket
2019 in Indian cricket
2019 in South African cricket